Karl-Ferdinand Kornel (25 August 1882 Tsooru, Kreis Werro – 19 September 1953 Irkutsk Oblast, Russia) was an Estonian jurist, journalist, diplomat and politician. He was a member of the II and III Riigikogu.

Kornel began his civil service as a diplomat at the Estonian Embassy in Latvia in 1919.

From 1926 until 1927, he was Minister of Commerce and Industry.

On 28 November 1945, Kornel was arrested by the Soviet authorities and was sentenced on 10 April 1946 to ten years in prison. He died in custody on 19 September 1953 in the gulag camp system in Irkutsk Oblast.

References

1882 births
1953 deaths
People from Antsla Parish
People from Kreis Werro
Estonian People's Party politicians
Government ministers of Estonia
Members of the Estonian Constituent Assembly
Members of the Riigikogu, 1923–1926
Members of the Riigikogu, 1926–1929
Estonian diplomats
Estonian journalists
Estonian jurists
University of Tartu alumni
Recipients of the Cross of Liberty (Estonia)
Recipients of the Order of the White Star, 2nd Class
People who died in the Gulag
Estonian people who died in Soviet detention